The 2020 French Open Men's Singles final was the championship tennis match of the men's singles tournament at the 2020 French Open, with Rafael Nadal defeating Novak Djokovic 6–0, 6–2, 7–5. It was a Grand Slam final match of historic proportions for both players. Nadal was aiming to become the first man to win a thirteenth French Open title, extending the record he himself held. Furthermore, Nadal was aiming to tie Roger Federer's all-time record of twenty Grand Slam men's singles titles. Djokovic was aiming to become the first man in the Open Era and first since Rod Laver in the 1960s to win all of the Grand Slam events at least twice. Additionally, Nadal was aiming to become the first player to defeat Djokovic in a completed match in the 2020 season since Djokovic had remained unbeaten up until that point, save for his disqualification at the US Open.

Match
Rain before the start of the match meant the tournament referee took the decision to close the roof of Court Philippe Chatrier, meaning the final was the first at the French Open to be held under indoor conditions. Nadal won the first set 6–0, despite four of the six games going to deuce. The set was the first ever 6–0 set inflicted upon Djokovic in a Grand Slam final. The second set was also won by Nadal, this time 6–2. The third set was far more competitive. Nadal broke to lead 3–2 with serve, but was then broken by Djokovic for the first time in the match. Nadal broke again at 5–5, before serving out the championship to love, with an ace on the last point.

Statistics

Source

Post-match reactions

Djokovic during his post-match press conference: 
I don't have much to say but that I was completely overplayed by Rafa, by a better player on the court. He was not missing at all and getting every ball back, just playing tactically great. I felt well throughout the entire tournament. I thought I was in a great form. Certainly I could have played better, especially in the first two sets. But he did surprise me with the way he was playing, the quality of tennis he was producing, the level. He's phenomenal. He played a perfect match. The third set I managed to come back. I kind of found my groove on the court. Had my chances, didn't use them. He closed out the match. That's it. He was the far better player on the court today and absolutely deserved to win.

Nadal during his post match press conference, commented on matching Federer's Grand Slam tally: 
In terms of these records, of course I care, I am a big fan of the history of sport in general. I respect that a lot. For me it means a lot to share this number with Roger, no? But let's see what's going on when we finish our careers - we keep playing.

When asked about the level of his performance in the final, Nadal responded:
Yeah, well, of course I played at an amazing level of tennis, no? For two sets and a half I played great. I can't say another thing. Is impossible to have this score against him without playing great. Yeah, played a very good final. I played at my highest level when I needed to play at my highest level, so something I am very proud. The personal satisfaction is big because under the circumstances that we played this Roland Garros, even if I played an amazing match this afternoon, the conditions are a little bit not the conditions that I will choose, never, to play an event like this. I was able to adapt well. I was able to, as I say the first day, to be positive in every circumstances that I was facing during the whole event, trying to accept all the challenges in terms of sometimes the feeling on the ball haven't been great because of the cold and everything. But I take it in a positive way, no? I just tried to work every day with the right determination, looking for my goals. Yeah, I think is one of the Roland Garros that have a better personal value for myself.

Federer commented on social media after the match: 
I have always had the utmost respect for my friend Rafa as a person and as a champion. As my greatest rival over many years, I believe we have pushed each other to become better players. Therefore, it is a true honour for me to congratulate him on his 20th Grand Slam victory. It is especially amazing that he has now won Roland-Garros an incredible 13 times, which is one of the greatest achievements in sport. I also congratulate his team, because nobody can do this alone. I hope 20 is just another step on the continuing journey for both of us. Well done, Rafa. You deserve it.

Significance

Nadal, in winning the title, moved level with Federer's record twenty Grand Slam single titles. Federer had been alone as the all-time leader since  Wimbledon 2009 where he had won his fifteenth Grand Slam title and moved clear of Pete Sampras' then record fourteen. Had Djokovic won, he would have claimed an eighteenth Grand Slam singles title and as such closed to within one of Nadal's count and two of Federer's. Furthermore, he also would have become the first man in the Open Era to have won each of the Grand Slam titles on two occasions (Djokovic would achieve this eight months later at the 2021 French Open). This victory for Nadal is seen to be of huge importance as part of the ongoing debate over which of the so-called  Big Three will go down as the greatest of all time. This was also the fourth time Nadal won the French Open without dropping a set.

Djokovic coming into the event had not lost a single completed match for the entire season, his only one official loss coming through his default at the US Open. In late August he had commented that 'anything is possible' when asked about whether he could go unbeaten for the whole season. As such, this was Djokovic's first defeat for a completed match during the 2020 season. Despite leading their Grand Slam meetings 9–6 before their meeting, Nadal had not beaten Djokovic at a Major since the 2014 French Open final, over six years prior to this match.

See also
 Djokovic–Nadal rivalry
 Open Era tennis records – men's singles
 Big Three

References

External links 
 Match details at the official ATP site
 Djokovic-Nadal head-to-head at the official ATP site
 Match highlights on YouTube

Men's Singles
2020
Rafael Nadal tennis matches
Novak Djokovic tennis matches